is a passenger railway station in located in the city of Iga,  Mie Prefecture, Japan, operated by the private railway operator Iga Railway.

Lines
Idamichi Station is served by the Iga Line, and is located 8.0 rail kilometers from the starting point of the line at Iga-Ueno Station.

Station layout
The station consists two opposed side platforms connected by a level crossing. The station is unattended and has no station building. The platform is short, and can only handle trains of two cars in length.

Platform

Adjacent stations

History
Idamichi Station was opened on July 18, 1922. Through a series of mergers, the Iga Line became part of the Kintetsu network by June 1, 1944, but was spun out as an independent company in October 2007.

Passenger statistics
In fiscal 2019, the station was used by an average of 41 passengers daily (boarding passengers only).

Surrounding area
The surrounding area is the countryside. There is an intersection of Japan National Route 422 and Mie Prefectural Highway 688 in front of the station.

See also
List of railway stations in Japan

References

External links

  

Railway stations in Japan opened in 1922
Railway stations in Mie Prefecture
Iga, Mie